Fan Yang Mai I or Pham Duong Mai I (Chinese: 范陽邁, Middle Chinese: buam’-jɨaŋ-maɨjh/mɛ:jh) was briefly the king of Champa, an area populated by the Cham ethnic group in present-day Vietnam. He overthrew the previous dynasty and seized the throne in 420, following years of internal trouble. According to the Chinese Book of Jin and Book of Song, after launching an unsuccessful raid in Tonkin, he requested investiture from China in 421. He died in the same year.

His name means "Prince of Gold", and before his death, the Chinese Court recognized him as the King of Champa.  He was succeeded by his son Tou, who assumed his father's name.

Bibliography

References 

Kings of Champa
5th-century monarchs in Asia
5th-century Vietnamese people